Mount Izvor is the mostly ice-covered peak rising to 1646 m in the west part of Voden Heights on Oscar II Coast in Graham Land.  It surmounts a tributary to Fleece Glacier to the southwest.  The feature is named after the settlements of Izvor in Southeastern, Southern, Western and Northwestern Bulgaria.

Location
British mapping in 1976.

Maps
 British Antarctic Territory.  Scale 1:200000 topographic map.  DOS 610 Series, Sheet W 65 62.  Directorate of Overseas Surveys, Tolworth, UK, 1976.
 Antarctic Digital Database (ADD). Scale 1:250000 topographic map of Antarctica. Scientific Committee on Antarctic Research (SCAR). Since 1993, regularly upgraded and updated.

Notes

References
 Mount Izvor. SCAR Composite Antarctic Gazetteer.
 Bulgarian Antarctic Gazetteer. Antarctic Place-names Commission. (details in Bulgarian, basic data in English)

External links
 Mount Izvor. Copernix satellite image

Izvor
Oscar II Coast
Bulgaria and the Antarctic